Máximo Eladio Reyes Caraza (born 8 January 1948) is a Peruvian football defender who played for Juan Aurich and Peru in the 1970 FIFA World Cup.

Club career
He also played for Alianza Lima.

International career
Reyes earned 7 caps for Peru, scoring no goals.

References

External links

FIFA profile

1948 births
Living people
People from Ica Region
Peruvian footballers
Peru international footballers
Association football defenders
Club Alianza Lima footballers
Juan Aurich footballers
Deportivo Municipal footballers
Deportivo Cali footballers
C.D. Veracruz footballers
Cienciano footballers
Unión Huaral footballers
Peruvian Primera División players
Categoría Primera A players
Peruvian expatriate footballers
Expatriate footballers in Colombia
Expatriate footballers in Mexico
Expatriate footballers in Venezuela
1970 FIFA World Cup players
Liga MX players